Claudette Colbert (born Émilie Claudette Chauchoin; September 13, 1903July 30, 1996) was a French-American actress. Colbert began her career in Broadway productions during the late 1920s and progressed to films with the advent of talking pictures. Initially associated with Paramount Pictures, she gradually shifted to working as an actress free of the studio system. She won the Academy Award for Best Actress for It Happened One Night (1934), and received two other Academy Award nominations during her career. Colbert's other notable films include Cleopatra (1934) and The Palm Beach Story (1942).

With her round face, big eyes, aristocratic manner, and flair for light comedy and emotional drama, Colbert's versatility led to her becoming one of the best-paid stars of the 1930s and 1940s and, in 1938 and 1942, the highest-paid. In all, Colbert starred in more than 60 movies. Among her frequent co-stars were Fred MacMurray, in seven films (1935–1949), and Fredric March, in four films (1930–1933).

By the early 1950s, Colbert had turned from the screen to television and stage work, and she earned a Tony Award nomination for The Marriage-Go-Round in 1959. Her career waned in the early 1960s, however in the late 1970s, it experienced a resurgence in theater. Colbert received a Sarah Siddons Award for her Chicago theater work in 1980. Colbert's television work in The Two Mrs. Grenvilles (1987) earned her a Golden Globe Award and an Emmy Award nomination.

In 1999, the American Film Institute named Colbert the 12th-greatest female star of classic Hollywood cinema.

Early life
Émilie Claudette Chauchoin was born in 1903 in Saint-Mandé, France, to Jeanne Marie ( Loew; 1877–1970) and Georges Claude Chauchoin (1867–1925).

Although christened "Émilie", she was called "Lily" after Jersey-born actress Lillie Langtry, and because an unmarried aunt of the same name—her maternal grandmother's adopted child, Émilie Loew—was living with the family. Jeanne, Emilie Loew, and Colbert's grandmother, Marie Augustine Loew,  were born in the Channel Islands. Thus, they were already fluent English speakers before moving to the U.S. Colbert's brother, Charles Auguste Chauchoin (1898–1971), was also born in the Bailiwick of Jersey. Jeanne held various occupations. While Georges Chauchoin had lost the sight in his right eye and had not settled into a profession, he worked as investment banker, suffering business setbacks. Marie Loew had already been to the U.S., and Georges' brother-in-law (surnamed Vedel) was already living in New York City. Marie was willing to help Georges financially, but also encouraged him to try his luck in the U.S.

To pursue more employment opportunities, Colbert and her family, including Marie and Emilie Loew, emigrated to Manhattan in 1906.

They lived in a fifth-floor walk-up at 53rd Street. Colbert stated that climbing those stairs every day until 1922 made her legs beautiful. Her parents formally changed her legal name to Lily Claudette Chauchoin. Georges Chauchoin worked as a minor official at First National City Bank, and the family was naturalized in 1912. Before Colbert entered public school, she quickly learnt English from her grandmother Marie, and grew up as bilingual speaking both English and French. She had hoped to become a painter ever since she had grasped her first pencil. Her mother was an opera music fan.

Colbert studied at Washington Irving High School, which was known for its strong arts program. Her speech teacher, Alice Rossetter, encouraged her to audition for a play Rossetter had written. In 1919, Colbert made her stage debut at the Provincetown Playhouse in The Widow's Veil at the age of 15.  Her interests, though,  still leaned towards painting, fashion design, and commercial art. 

Intending to become a fashion designer, she attended the Art Students League of New York, where she paid for her art education by working in a dress shop. After attending a party with writer  Anne Morrison, Colbert was offered a bit part in Morrison's play,  and appeared on the Broadway stage in a small role in The Wild Westcotts (1923). She had used the name Claudette, instead of Lily, since high school; for her stage name, she added her maternal grandmother's maiden name, Colbert.  Her father, Georges, died in 1925, and her grandmother, Marie Loew, died in New York in 1930.

Career

Early theater roles, 1924–1927 

In 1924, producer Al Woods, impressed by Colbert's ability to speak with both American and British accents, cast her in Frederick Lonsdale's The Fake, but she was replaced by Frieda Inescort before it opened. After signing a five-year contract with Woods, Colbert played ingenue roles on Broadway from 1925 to 1929. During this period she disliked being typecast as a French maid. Colbert later said, "In the very beginning, they wanted to give me French roles … That's why I used to say my name 'Col-bert' just as it is spelled, instead of 'Col-baire'. I did not want to be typed as 'that French girl. By 1925 she was having success in the comedy A Kiss in a Taxi, which ran for 103 performances over a two-month period. She received critical acclaim as a carnival snake charmer in the Broadway production of The Barker (1927), and reprised the role in London's West End. She was noticed by theatrical producer Leland Hayward, who suggested her for the heroine role in the silent film For the Love of Mike (1927). Now believed to be lost, the film did not fare well at the box office.

Movie stardom, 1928–1934 

In 1928, Colbert signed a contract with Paramount Pictures. A demand existed for stage actors who could handle dialogue in the new "talkies", and Colbert's elegance and musical voice were among her best assets. Her beauty drew attention in The Hole in the Wall (1929), but at first she did not like film acting. Her earliest films were produced in New York. During the filming of The Lady Lies (also 1929), she was also appearing nightly in the play See Naples and Die. The Lady Lies was a box-office success. In 1930, she starred opposite Maurice Chevalier in The Big Pond, which was filmed in both English and French. She co-starred with Fredric March in Manslaughter (1930), receiving critical acclaim for her performance as a woman charged with vehicular manslaughter. She was paired with March again in Honor Among Lovers (1931). She also starred in Mysterious Mr. Parkes (1931), a French-language version of Slightly Scarlet for the European market, although it was also screened in the United States. She sang and played piano in the Ernst Lubitsch musical The Smiling Lieutenant (1931), which was nominated for the Academy Award for Best Picture. Colbert's ability to "hold her man" (Maurice Chevalier again) surpassed "Queen" Miriam Hopkins, according to David Shipman. Colbert concluded the year with appearance in a modestly successful His Woman (1931) with Gary Cooper.

Colbert's career got a further boost when Cecil B. DeMille cast her as femme fatale Poppaea in the historical epic The Sign of the Cross (1932), opposite Fredric March and Charles Laughton. In one of the best-remembered scenes of her film career, she bathes nude in a marble pool filled with asses' milk. The film was one of her biggest box-office hits.

In 1933, Colbert renegotiated her contract with Paramount to allow her to appear in films for other studios. Her musical voice, a contralto that footnotes list as being coached by Bing Crosby, was also featured in Torch Singer (1933), co-starring Ricardo Cortez and David Manners. Partly as a result, she was ranked as the year's 13th box-office star. By 1933, she had appeared in 21 films, averaging four per year. Many of her early films were commercial successes, and her performances were admired. Her leading roles were down-to-earth and diverse, highlighting her versatility.

Colbert was initially reluctant to appear in the screwball comedy It Happened One Night (1934). The studio agreed to pay her $50,000 for the role, and guaranteed filming would be done within four weeks so she could take a planned vacation. She won the Academy Award for Best Actress for the film.

In Cleopatra (1934), Colbert played the title role opposite Warren William and Henry Wilcoxon. It was the highest-grossing picture of that year in the United States. Thereafter, Colbert did not wish to be portrayed as overtly sexual, and later refused such roles. Imitation of Life (1934), when she was on loan to Universal, was another box-office success. Those three films were nominated for the Academy Award for Best Picture in the next year. Colbert is the only actress to date to star in three films nominated for Best Motion Picture in the same year.

Post-Oscar career, 1935–1944
Colbert's rising profile again allowed her to renegotiate her contract, which raised her salary. For 1935 and 1936, she was listed sixth and eighth in Quigley's annual "Top-Ten Money-Making Stars Poll". She received an Academy Award nomination for her role in the hospital drama Private Worlds (1935).

In 1936, Colbert signed a new contract with Paramount, making her Hollywood's highest-paid actress. When the studio renewed her contract in 1938, she was again reported to be Hollywood's top-paid actress, with a salary of $426,924. At the peak of her popularity in the late 1930s, she earned $150,000 per film. In 1937 and 1938, she was listed as the 14th and sixth (respectively) top money-making woman in the U.S.

Colbert spent the rest of the 1930s deftly alternating between romantic comedies and dramas: She Married Her Boss (1935) with Melvyn Douglas; The Gilded Lily (1935) and The Bride Comes Home (1935), both with Fred MacMurray; Under Two Flags (1936) with Ronald Colman; Zaza (1939) with Herbert Marshall; Midnight (1939) with Don Ameche; and It's a Wonderful World (1939) with James Stewart.

Columnist Hedda Hopper wrote that Colbert placed her career "ahead of everything, save possibly her marriage", and that she had a strong sense of what was best for her, and a "deep-rooted desire to be in shape, efficient, and under control". Biographer A. Scott Berg wrote that Colbert "helped define femininity for her generation with her chic manner". Colbert once said, "I know what's best for me—after all, I have been in the Claudette Colbert business longer than anybody."

Colbert was very particular about how she appeared on-screen, and believed her face was difficult to light and photograph. She insisted on having the right side of her face away from the camera because of a small bump from a broken nose as a child. This sometimes required movie sets to be redesigned. During the filming of Tovarich (1937), director Anatole Litvak dismissed one of her favored cameramen. After seeing the rushes filmed by his replacement, Colbert refused to continue. She insisted on hiring her own cameraman, and offered to waive her salary if the film went over budget as a result. Gary Cooper was terrified at the prospect of working with Colbert in his first comedy, Bluebeard's Eighth Wife (1938), considering Colbert an expert in the genre.

Colbert learnt about lighting and cinematography, and refused to begin filming until she was satisfied that she would be shown to her best advantage. Drums Along the Mohawk (1939) with Henry Fonda was her first color film, and one of the year's top-20 grossing pictures. However, she mistrusted the relatively new Technicolor process, and fearing she would not photograph well, preferred thereafter to be filmed in black-and-white.

During this time, she began performing on CBS's popular radio program Lux Radio Theater, and was heard in 22 episodes between 1935 and 1954. She also participated in 13 episodes of radio's The Screen Guild Theater, between 1939 and 1952.

In 1940, Colbert refused a seven-year contract with Paramount that would have paid her $200,000 a year, after learning she could command $150,000 per film as a freelance artist. With her manager, Colbert secured roles in prestigious films, and this period marked the height of her earning ability. Boom Town, released in August 1940, was the highest-grossing picture of the year in the United States. However, Colbert once said that Arise, My Love (1940) was her favorite of all her movies. It won the Academy Award for Best Story.

During filming of So Proudly We Hail! (1943), a rift occurred between Colbert and co-star Paulette Goddard, who preferred another co-star, Veronica Lake, to Colbert. Colbert felt that Goddard treated her like an old lady. Goddard said that Colbert "flipped", that she "was at [my] eyes at every moment", and that they continued their feud for the duration of filming. This was unusual for Colbert, who was otherwise known for maintaining high standards of professionalism.

Impressed by Colbert's role in So Proudly We Hail!, David O. Selznick approached her to play the lead in Since You Went Away (1944). She was initially reluctant to appear as a mother of teenaged children, but Selznick eventually won her over. Released in June 1944, the film made almost $5 million at the US box office and was the year's third highest-grossing picture. Critic James Agee praised aspects of the film, but particularly Colbert's work. Partly as a result, she received an Academy Award nomination for Best Actress.

Postwar career, 1945–1965

In 1945, Colbert ended her association with Paramount and continued to freelance in such films as Guest Wife (1945) with Don Ameche. She starred opposite John Wayne in RKO's Without Reservations (1946), which grossed $3 million in the U.S. While working on it, director Mervyn LeRoy described Colbert as an "interesting" lady to work with, recalling her habit of not watching where she was going and constantly bumping into things. Praised for her sense of style and fashion, Colbert ensured throughout her career that she was impeccably groomed and costumed. For the melodrama Tomorrow Is Forever (1946), Jean Louis was hired to create 18 changes of wardrobe for her. Tomorrow is Forever and The Secret Heart (also 1946) were also substantial commercial successes, and Colbert's popularity during 1947 led her to place 9th in Quigley's "Top Ten Money-Making Stars Poll".

She achieved great success opposite Fred MacMurray in the comedy The Egg and I (1947), which was the year's second-highest grossing picture, and later acknowledged as the 12th-most profitable American film of the 1940s. The suspense film Sleep, My Love (1948) with Robert Cummings was a modest commercial success. By 1949, she still ranked as the 22nd-highest box-office star.

The romantic comedy Bride for Sale (1949), wherein Colbert played part of a love triangle that included George Brent and Robert Young, was well-reviewed. Her performance in the Pacific war film Three Came Home (1950) was also praised by critics. However, the mystery melodrama The Secret Fury (1950), distributed by RKO Studios, received mixed reviews. During this period, Colbert was unable to work beyond 5 p.m. each day due to orders from her doctor. While Colbert still looked like a young woman, she found it difficult making the transition to playing more mature characters as she entered middle age. She said, "I'm a very good comedienne, but I was always fighting that image, too."

In 1949, Colbert was selected to play Margo Channing in All About Eve, because producer Joseph L. Mankiewicz felt that she best represented the style he envisioned for the part. However, Colbert severely injured her back, forcing her to abandon the picture shortly before filming began. Bette Davis was cast, instead, and received an Oscar nomination for the film. In later life, Colbert said, "I just never had the luck to play bitches."

In the early 1950s, Colbert traveled to Europe for tax purposes and joined fewer films. The Planter's Wife (1952) was a success in British market. She played a supporting role in Royal Affairs in Versailles (1954), her only film with a French director (Sacha Guitry). It was screened in the United States in 1957.

In 1954, Colbert turned down a million-dollar broadcast deal with NBC-TV, but made a pact with CBS-TV to star in several teleplays. After a successful appearance in a television version of The Royal Family (a parody of the Barrymore family in The Best of Broadway series), she took on more television work. She starred in television adaptations of Blithe Spirit in 1956 and The Bells of St. Mary's in 1959, and guest-starred on Robert Montgomery Presents and Playhouse 90.

In 1956, Colbert hosted the 28th Academy Awards ceremony.

In 1957, she was cast as Lucy Bradford, wife of schoolteacher Jim Bradford (Jeff Morrow), in the "Blood in the Dust" episode of CBS's Dick Powell's Zane Grey Theatre. In the story, Jim refuses to back down when a gunman orders him to leave town, and Lucy is distressed because Jim hasn't fired a weapon since he was in the Civil War.

In the show's 1960 episode "So Young the Savage Land", she played Beth Brayden, who becomes disillusioned with her rancher-husband Jim (John Dehner) when he turns to violence to protect their property.<ref>{{cite web|url=http://www.tv.com/shows/zane-grey-theater/so-young-the-savage-land-108166/
|title=So Young the Savage Land on Dick Powell's Zane Grey Theatre|publisher=tv.com
 |access-date=June 6, 2021}}</ref>

In 1958, she returned to Broadway in The Marriage-Go-Round, for which she was nominated for a Best Actress Tony Award.

She made a brief return to the screen, opposite Troy Donahue in Parrish (1961). It was her last appearance on the big screen, and she played the supporting role of the mother. The film was a commercial success, but Colbert received little attention, and she directed her agent to end any further attempts to generate interest in her as a film actress.

Later career, 1962–1987
Colbert made successful Broadway appearances in The Irregular Verb to Love (1963); in The Kingfisher (1978), with co-star Rex Harrison; and in Frederick Lonsdale's Aren't We All? (1985), also with Harrison. She told an interviewer, "Audiences always sound like they're glad to see me, and I'm damned glad to see them."　

She appeared in a supporting role in the television miniseries The Two Mrs. Grenvilles (1987), which was a ratings success, and for which she won a Golden Globe and was nominated for an Emmy Award. Towards the end of her life, she explained why she had never written her autobiography, "I've been happy, and that's no story."

Modern critics have pointed out that Colbert had a unique set of assets—her round apple-face, big eyes, curly hair, slender body, elegant voice, aristocratic manner, relaxed acting, tongue-in-cheek vivacity, intelligent style, comedic timing, and ladylike alluring charm—that distinguishes her from other comediennes of the 1930s. In her comedies, she invariably played shrewd, self-reliant women;  unlike many of her contemporaries, though, she rarely engaged in physical comedy. Her characters were more likely to be observers and commentators.

Personal life
In 1928, Colbert married actor and director Norman Foster, with whom she co-starred in the Broadway show The Barker, and in the film Young Man of Manhattan (1930), for which he received negative reviews as one of her weakest leading men. Their marriage remained a secret for many years while they lived in separate homes.

In Los Angeles, Colbert shared a home with her mother, Jeanne Chauchoin, but her domineering mother disliked Foster and reputedly did not allow him into the home. Colbert and Foster divorced in 1935 in Mexico.

On Christmas Eve, 1935, in Yuma, Arizona, Colbert married Dr. Joel Pressman, who eventually became a professor and chief of the head and neck surgery department of UCLA Medical School. She gave a Beechcraft single-engined airplane to Pressman as a present. They purchased a ranch in Northern California, where Colbert enjoyed horseback riding and her husband kept show cattle. During this time, Colbert drove a Lincoln Continental and a Ford Thunderbird. The marriage lasted 33 years, until Pressman's death from liver cancer in 1968.

Jeanne Chauchoin reportedly envied her daughter, preferred her son's company, and made Colbert's brother Charles serve as his sister's agent. Charles used the surname Wendling, borrowed from Jeanne's paternal grandmother Rose Wendling. He served as Colbert's business manager for a time, and was credited with negotiating some of her more lucrative contracts in the late 1930s and early 1940s.

Although virtually retired from motion pictures since the mid-1950s, Colbert was still financially solvent enough to maintain an upscale lifestyle. She had a country house in Palm Springs for weekends, and rented a cottage in Cap Ferrat in southeastern France. Adman Peter Rogers said, "Claudette was extravagant; I never, ever saw her question the price of anything." In 1963, Colbert sold her Lloyd Wright-designed residence in Holmby Hills (West Los Angeles), and Dr. Pressman and she rented a small house in Beverly Hills.

In 1958, she met Verna Hull, a wealthy painter, photographer and the stepdaughter of a Sears Roebuck heiress. They had a nine-year friendship that included travel, an interest in art, and rented twin New York penthouses. When Colbert bought a house in Barbados in the early 1960s, Hull bought a house next door, amid rumors that their friendship was a romantic one, which Colbert denied. The friendship ended after an argument that took place as Colbert's husband lay dying, wherein Hull insisted Pressman would not only take his life, but Colbert's, too, rather than die alone. Pressman died on February 26, 1968.

Colbert was a lifelong Republican.

Later years and death
For years, Colbert divided her time between her Manhattan apartment and her vacation home in Speightstown, Barbados. The latter, purchased from a British gentleman and nicknamed Bellerive, was the island's only plantation house fronting the beach. However, her permanent address remained Manhattan.

When Colbert's mother Jeanne died in 1970, and her brother Charles in 1971, her only surviving relative was her brother's daughter, Coco Lewis.

Colbert sustained a series of small strokes during the last three years of her life. She died in 1996 in Barbados, where she had employed a housekeeper and two cooks. She was 92. Her remains were transported to New York City for cremation and funeral services.

A requiem mass was later held at Church of St. Vincent Ferrer in Manhattan. Her ashes are laid to rest in the Godings Bay Church Cemetery, Speightstown, Saint Peter, Barbados, alongside her mother and second husband.

Colbert never had children. She left most of her estate, estimated at $3.5 million and including her Manhattan apartment and Bellerive, to a long-time friend, Helen O'Hagan, a retired director of corporate relations at Saks Fifth Avenue. Colbert met O'Hagan in 1961 on the set of Parrish, her last film,"Colbert's Will Provides for Long-Time Friends", Austin American-Statesman, August 10, 1996, p. B12 and they became best friends around 1970.

After Pressman's death, Colbert instructed her friends to treat O'Hagan as they had Pressman, "as her spouse". Although O'Hagan was financially comfortable without the generous bequest, Bellerive was sold for over $2 million to David Geffen. Colbert's will also left $150,000 to her niece Coco Lewis; a trust of over $100,000 to UCLA, in Pressman's memory; and $75,000 to Marie Corbin, her Bajan housekeeper.

Awards and honors

 Selected filmography 

The following is a list of feature films in which Colbert had top billing.

 The Hole in the Wall (1929)
 Young Man of Manhattan (1930)
 Manslaughter	(1930)
 Honor Among Lovers (1931)
 Secrets of a Secretary (1931)
 The Wiser Sex (1932)
 Misleading Lady (1932)
 The Man from Yesterday (1932)
 Tonight Is Ours (1933)
 Three-Cornered Moon (1933)
 Torch Singer (1933)
 Four Frightened People (1934)
 It Happened One Night (1934)
 Cleopatra (1934)
 Imitation of Life (1934)
 The Gilded Lily (1935)
 Private Worlds (1935)
 She Married Her Boss (1935)
 The Bride Comes Home (1935)
 Maid of Salem (1937)
 I Met Him in Paris (1937)
 Tovarich (1937)	
 Zaza (1939)
 Midnight (1939)
 It's a Wonderful World (1939) 
 Drums Along the Mohawk (1939)
 Arise, My Love (1940)
 Skylark (1941)
 Remember the Day (1941)
 The Palm Beach Story (1942)
 No Time for Love (1943)
 So Proudly We Hail! (1943)
 Since You Went Away (1944)
 Practically Yours (1944)
 Guest Wife (1945)
 Tomorrow Is Forever (1946)
 Without Reservations (1946)	
 The Secret Heart (1946)
 The Egg and I (1947)
 Sleep, My Love (1948)
 Family Honeymoon (1949)
 Bride for Sale (1949)	
 Three Came Home (1950)
 The Secret Fury (1950)	
 Thunder on the Hill (1951)
 Let's Make It Legal (1951)	
 The Planter's Wife (1952)
 Texas Lady'' (1955)

See also

 List of actors with Academy Award nominations

References

Notes

Bibliography

External links

 
 

1903 births
1996 deaths
20th-century American actresses
American film actresses
American stage actresses
Art Students League of New York alumni
Best Actress Academy Award winners
Best Supporting Actress Golden Globe (television) winners
Catholics from New York (state)
Disease-related deaths in Barbados
French emigrants to the United States
French people of British descent
Kennedy Center honorees
New York (state) Republicans
Paramount Pictures contract players
People from Holmby Hills, Los Angeles
People from Saint-Mandé
People with acquired American citizenship
Washington Irving High School (New York City) alumni